Deh Ali Qoli (also Romanized as Deh ‘Alī Qolī; also known as ‘Alī Qolī, Alīqoīi, and ‘Alīqolī Kholeh) is a village in Zirtang Rural District, Kunani District, Kuhdasht County, Lorestan Province, Iran. At the 2006 census, its population was 183, in 35 families.

References 

Towns and villages in Kuhdasht County